The president of the Legislative Yuan is the presiding officer of the Legislative Yuan of the Republic of China. The incumbent president is Yu Shyi-kun, a Democratic Progressive Party legislator and the second DPP President of the Legislative Yuan.

Election
The president is elected by and from among all members of the Yuan in a preparatory meeting held on the first reporting day of the first session of each Legislative Yuan, and he shall serve a term the same length as that of other members.

Duty
The president presides over the Yuan Sittings and the meetings of the Committee of the Entire Yuan and is responsible for the administration of the Yuan. In the cases in which the president of the Legislative Yuan is unable to attend to his or her duties, the vice president acts in his or her place.

List of presidents of the Legislative Yuan

Pre-1947 Constitution
During the Nationalist government era, the President of Legislative Yuan was appointed by the Central Committee of the Kuomintang (Nationalist Party).

1947 Constitution
The first Legislative Yuan election under the 1947 Constitution of the Republic of China was held in 1948. However, the government retreated to Taiwan in 1949. Members of the first Legislative Yuan had their terms extended indefinitely and the sessions of the first Legislative Yuan were conducted in Taiwan until December 31, 1991 while some supplementary members kept serving until January 31, 1993.

1991 Constitution amendment
The Additional Articles of the Constitution promulgated in 1991 mandated the total re-election of Legislative Yuan in Taiwan.

Timeline

See also

 Legislative Yuan
 Legislative elections in Taiwan
 Government of the Republic of China
 List of political office-holders of the Republic of China by age
 Chairman of the Standing Committee of the National People's Congress

References

Politics of the Republic of China
Lists of political office-holders in the Republic of China
Lists of legislative speakers in Asia